Fryerning is a small village and former civil parish, now in the parish of Ingatestone and Fryerning, which is situated approximately  north of Ingatestone in Essex, England. The parish church of St. Mary the Virgin, on Blackmore Road, dates back from the 11th century, with a 15th-century brick tower. It has a memorial stained glass window to the murdered politician Airey Neave, which was unveiled by his cousin Penelope in 1985. An ancient English Yew, found to the west of the church and is over a millennium old, is thought to be one of Essex's oldest trees. In 1881, the parish had a population of 704.

Fryerning is located in mid-Essex and has several big areas of woodland populated by several large herds of deer, which are frequently seen by walkers and cyclists.

The village has no shops, but two pubs: The Cricketers and The Viper; the latter becomes particularly busy during its biannual beer festivals.

History 

Fryerning and nearby Ingatestone have always been closely entwined. The earliest surviving signs of their ancient past can be seen on the Fryerning Lane, which connects with Ingatestone High Street, where two large Sarsen Stones mark either side of the lane.

Saxon Period 
The name Fryerning derives from the Saxon period. The syllable "ing" denoting possession, probably during the sixth century, thus Saxon territories each distinguished by the owners name; these were usually prefixed by "ing" or "ging", a principle shared with neighbouring villages: Margaretting, Mountnessing and Ingrave.

Norman Period 
After the Norman conquest, the "ings" or "gings" were divided up. Fryerning and Ingatestone were collectively known as Ging-at-the Stone and was given to the Norman Baron Robert de Germon. Later on, his grandson Gilbert Mountfitchet granted half the manor called Ginges, along with the church St Mary's, to the Knights Hospitallers of Jerusalem and that part was known as Ging Hospital. The Knights Hospitallers constructed a barn at North Hall Farm, which survives to this day; the 13th-century barn is comparable to the better-preserved barn of Cressing Temple in Witham.

Tudor Period 
In 1540, the Knights Hospitallers were suppressed by Henry VIII when the Ging Hospital was transferred to Sir William Berners, the Royal auditor; the area then became known as Ging Berners. Later, in the 16th century, part of the area came into the possession of the De Vere family, Earls of Oxford.

Three generations later, William Berners great-grandson sold Fryerning to Sir Nicolas Wadham, whose daughter, Dorothy Wadhams, married Sir William Petre. William and Dorothy later went on to found Wadham College in Oxford, which still owns land in Fryerning and is the Patron of the parish.

Modern Period 
On 24 Match 1889, the parish was abolished and merged with Ingatestone to form Ingatestone and Fryerning.

In 1936, a Spanish oak tree was planted on in the centre of the ancient Church Green to commemorate the Coronation of King Edward VIII. At the time, there was a debate in the village due to the fact that the Oak was not a native English specimen. Local resident, Charlie Cox who was eight at the time, remembers that the green was about 50 yards long on each side forming a triangle.

In 1948, the Ingatestone and Fryerning Dart League was set up between Pubs Anchor A, Anchor B, British Legion, Crown Hotel, Spread Eagle, Woolpack Hotel Fryerning and Viper Hotel Mill Green.

In 2011, Brentwood Borough Council  asked Essex County Council to commission a conservation area in Fryerning, which was subsequently enforced. Many historical buildings, ranging from the 12th century to the late 20th century, were included in the conservation area, along with 3 trees having a preservation order placed upon them: the Coronation Oak and the West and East Ancient Yew Trees at St Mary's Church.

On the 11th of September 2021, Lord Petre visited local residents and dignitaries of Fryerning, at the Church Green, to officially open the recently renovated Fryerning Parish Room; it was built in 1904, extended in 1924 and renovated in 2021.

References

External links

 Fryerning Parish Church

Villages in Essex
Former civil parishes in Essex
Borough of Brentwood